The Hawaii Pacific Baptist Convention (HPBC) is a group of churches affiliated with the Southern Baptist Convention located in the U.S. state of Hawaii and other pacific regions. Headquartered in Honolulu, it is made up of 138 churches on 11 islands in 6 Baptist associations.

History
Baptist work had its beginning in 1926 when Charles J. McDonald, a layman, started work in the town of Wahiawa with a Sunday School which eventually became the First Baptist Church of Wahiawa.

A few Southern Baptist missionaries stopped in Hawaii for short periods of time between 1937 and 1938 but it was not until 1940, when all of the missionaries in China and Japan were forced out of these countries, that the International Mission Board (then known as the Foreign Mission Board) began thinking about opening work in these islands. As these first Baptist missionaries came and surveyed the islands, they concluded 6 percent of the people were nominally Christian.

On December 12, 1940, the Hawaiian Mission of the Foreign Mission Board was formally organized and Wahiawa church was the first church to affiliate. In 1941, the Olivet Baptist Church was constituted in Honolulu out of the work which was started by layman, Joseph Tyssowski. Southern Baptist missionary, Victor Koon, was called as the pastor of Olivet.

Twenty-four representatives (called messengers) from 5 churches (Wahiawa, Olivet, Nuuanu, Calvary and Waimea) met at the Baptist Bible School of Hawaii on July 12, 1943 and organized the Association of Baptist Churches of Hawaii.

The work spread to the other islands. A group of Christians meeting as the Missionary Bible Church in Waimea, Kauai, asked for help, and the Waimea Baptist Church was organized on this foundation in 1943. A Baptist chaplain stationed on Maui began a mission which later became the Kahului Baptist Church. A public school teacher, who was converted at the Olivet Baptist Church, began a Sunday School on the island of Molokai at an unused Buddhist temple. This group became the Kaunakakai Baptist Church. Dr. and Mrs. Charles Leonard felt led to go to Hilo, Hawaii, to open work there and were influential in starting the Kinoole Baptist Church.

Churches were established on each of the main islands of Hawaii. Meeting in school buildings, groups of people studied the Bible, were converted and eventually constituted churches throughout six of the islands. With the help of the Lottie Moon Christmas Offering, sanctuaries soon replaced these temporary meeting places. At the annual meeting of the Association of Baptist Churches of Hawaii, July 21 at Calvary Baptist Church, the organization's name was changed to Hawaii Baptist Convention.

The Baptist Student Union formed in Manoa. The Baptist Bible School of Hawaii opened staffed by missionaries appointed by the Foreign Mission Board. The first issue of the Hawaii Baptist; was produced with Joe W. Bailey as volunteer editor. Two acres of land on Heulu Street at Liholiho was purchased for a Baptist secondary School. The Hawaii Baptist Academy opened its doors to its first students in 1949. Over 1,100 students are enrolled today from kindergarten through 12th grade. Two campuses are located in Nuuanu Valley on Oahu.

A 16-acre campsite on the leeward coast of Oahu, the former home of the Waianae sugarcane plantation manager, was purchased. It was named Puu Kahea Baptist Assembly, "Echoing Hills"; in Hawaiian. With the coming of statehood to Hawaii, Foreign Mission Board support began to diminish in 1951 and the churches were challenged as never before to reach more adults, to increase in stewardship, to grow in total dedication to the cause of Christ, and to continue in their missionary outreach. The North American Mission Board (reorganized from the Home Mission Board in 1997) and other agencies, have continued to help Hawaii Pacific Baptists' missions and ministry opportunities.

In 1955 the first meeting of the HBC executive board met at the Baptist Student Center. The Samoa Baptist Academy began with 14 volunteer teachers.

In 1979 Wayland Baptist College opened in Hawaii as their first campus outside of Texas.  In 1981 the College changed its name to Wayland Baptist University.

In 1997 the name changed to the Hawaii Pacific Baptist Convention to represent the territories of the convention.

Doctrinal Beliefs
The Hawaii Pacific Baptist Convention currently affirms the Baptist Faith and Message of 1963 that is no longer adopted by the Southern Baptist Convention.

During the 2010 state convention, a recommendation was presented to the messengers to amend the Hawaii Pacific Baptist Convention's Constitution, Article III, Statement of Faith. The change would read, "The Convention shall be founded on a fellowship based on the Holy Bible, Old and New Testaments. Specific doctrinal distinctives are identified in any historic or current Baptist Faith and Message adopted by the Southern Baptist Convention. As of the current Amended Date, any future revision of the Baptist Faith and Message must be reviewed and affirmed by the Hawaii Pacific Baptist Convention for adoption."  The recommended amendment will go to a vote in 2011.

Presidents

 Dr. Victor Koon (1946-19??)
 Dr. Chester R. Young, Sr. (1952-1954)
 Pastor Ernest Mosley (1966-1967)
 Dan Liu (1967-1968)
 Mori Hiratani (1968-1970)
 Dr. Daniel Hen Chong Kong (early 1970s)
 Dr. W.C. Garland (1984-1986)
 Cliff Hoff (1986-1988)
 Donna Farr (1988-1990)
 Pastor Kenneth Newman (1990-1992)
 Paul Oyer (1992-1994)
 Paul Kaneshiro (1994-1996)
 George Moyer (1996-1998)
 Pastor Steve Murphy (1998-2000)
 George Iwahiro (2000–2002)
 Pastor Dan Van Alstine (2002-2004)
 Ken Sakai (2004–2006)
 Pastor Duane McDaniel (2006-2007)
 Pastor Robert Miller (2007–2009)
 Walt Agena (2009–2011)
 Pastor Steve Irvin (2011–2013)
 Pastor Alberto Camacho (2013-2015)
 Pastor John Endriss (2015-2017)

Associations
HPBC affiliate churches are organized in six associations.

Big Island Baptist Association
Churches affiliated with the BIBA include:
 Cornerstone Christian Fellowship
 Cornerstone Christian Fellowship North Kona
 Cornerstone Christian Fellowship South Kona
 Faith Baptist Mission
 First Baptist Church of Waimea
 Hamakua Baptist Church
 Hilo Baptist Church
 Hilo Korean Christian Church
 Kaumana Drive Baptist Church
 Kinoole Baptist Church
 Kohala Baptist Church
 Kona Baptist Church
 Ocean View Filipino
 Ocean View Baptist Mission
 Pahala Baptist Bible Mission
 Paradise Park Church
 Puna Baptist Church
 Puuanahulu Baptist Church
 Sonshine Baptist Mission
 Waiakea Uka Bible Church
 Waikoloa Baptist Church

Garden Island Baptist Association
 Lihue Baptist Church
 Waimea Baptist Church

Guam Baptist Association
 Calvary Baptist Church, Tamuning, Guam
 Chuukese Christian Fellowship
 Guam First Baptist Church, Tamuning, Guam
 Marianas Baptist Church, Agat, Guam
 Saipan Good Baptist Church (located on Saipan, Commonwealth of the Northern Mariana Islands
 Tamuning Christian Fellowship, Tamuning, Guam
 Yigo Mission

Maui County Baptist Association
 Kaanapali Beach Ministries
 Kahului Baptist Church
 Kaunakakai Baptist Church
 Kihei Baptist Chapel
 Lahaina Baptist Church
 Lanai Baptist Church
 Maui First Korean Baptist Church
 Maui Philippine Baptist Church
 Pukalani Baptist Church
 Valley Isle Fellowship

Oahu Baptist Network
 Abundant Life Christian Fellowship
 Agape Mission Baptist Church
 Aina Haina Baptist Church
 All Nations Fellowship
 All People Mission Church
 Antioch Baptist Church of Hawaii
 Bethel Korean Baptist Church
 Central Baptist Church
 Chinese Baptist Church
 Cornerstone Fellowship
 Cornerstone Korean Baptist Church
 Dong Tam Baptist Church
 Enchanted Lake Baptist Church
 Ewa Beach Baptist Church
 Faith Baptist Church
 Fellowship Baptist Church
 Filipino International Baptist Church
 First Baptist Church Haleiwa
 First Baptist Church of Nanakuli
 First Baptist Church of Pearl City
 First Baptist Church of Wahiawa
 First Baptist Church of Waimanalo
 First Southern Baptist Church of Pearl Harbor
 Halawa Heights Baptist Church
 Haleiwa Filipino Mission
 Hawaii Bhansok Baptist Church
 Hawaii Chinese Baptist Church
 Hawaii Christian Baptist Church
 Hawaii Hope Mission Baptist Church
 Hawaii Kai Church
 Honolulu Russian Baptist Church
 Iglesia Amistad
 International Baptist Fellowship
 Kahaluu Baptist Church
 Kailua Baptist Church
 Kailua First Korean Baptist Church
 Kalihi Baptist Church
 Khemaras Center
 Korean Baptist Church of Pearl Harbor
 Korean Baptist Church of Waikiki
 Makaha Valley Chapel
 Makakilo Baptist Church
 Mililani Baptist Church
 Mililani Fil-Am Baptist Church
 Mililani Korean Baptist Church
 Mt. Kaala Baptist Church
 Mountain View Community Church
 New Community Baptist Church
 New Covenant Baptist Church
 New Life Christian Church
 North Windward Baptist Chapel
 Nuuanu Baptist Church
 Nuuanu Chuukese Congregation
 Ohana Mission Baptist Church
 OlaNui!
 Olive Baptist Church
 Olivet Baptist Church
 Pali View Baptist Church
 Palisades Baptist Church
 Pawaa Community Church
 The Gathering
 University Avenue Baptist Church
 Village Park Baptist Church
 Waialae Baptist Church
 Waianae Baptist Church
 Waikiki Baptist Church
 Waipahu Community Christian
 Waipio Community Baptist Church
 West Oahu Community Church

South Pacific Baptist Association
 Emmanuel Baptist Church
 Fagalii Baptist Church
 Falemuaga Baptist Church
 Faleniu Baptist Church
 First Chinese Baptist Church of American Samoa
 Happy Valley Baptist Church
 Pago Pago Baptist Church
 Samoa Korean Baptist Church
 Seafarers' Christian Fellowship
 Tafuna Baptist Church

Asia Baptist Network 
 Koza Baptist Church (Okinawa, Japan)
 Seoul International Baptist Church (S. Korea)
 Songtan Central Baptist Church (S. Korea)
 Tokyo Baptist Church (Japan)
 Yokohama International Baptist Church (Japan)

Affiliated Organizations 
 Hawaii Baptist Academy: A Christ-centered K-12 education ministry to children
 Puu Kahea Conference Center: the conference center offers retreat and educational opportunities for churches and other organizations
 Wayland Baptist University: To educate students (undergraduate and graduate) in an academically challenging, learning-focused and distinctively Christian environment for professional success, lifelong learning, and service to God and humankind.

References

External links 
 HPBC Official Website
 Hawaii Baptist Academy Website
 Oahu Baptist Network Website

 

Baptist Christianity in Hawaii
Baptist denominations established in the 20th century
Christianity in American Samoa
Christianity in Guam
Christian organizations established in 1943
Christianity in the Northern Mariana Islands
1943 establishments in Hawaii